is a national highway of Japan that traverses the prefecture of Iwate in a southwest–northeast routing. It connects the prefecture's capital city, Morioka to the coastal city of Kuji.

Route description

National Route 281 crosses Iwate Prefecture in a southwest–northeast routing. Beginning at a junction with national routes 4 and 282 in the prefecture's capital city, Morioka, it travels north alongside the two routes out of Morioka. In the city of Takizawa, National Route 282 leaves the concurrency near Takizawa Interchange on the Tōhoku Expressway. The concurrency of national routes 4 and 281 continues northeast, briefly crossing back in to Morioka, before entering the town of Iwate. In Iwate, National Route 281 leaves National Route 4, traveling east across the Kitakami Mountains towards the coastal city of Kuji. In the mountains, it passes through the town of Kuzumaki where it briefly has a concurrency with National Route 340. Upon crossing over the crest of the mountains, the highway enters Kuji. From there, it follows the Kuji River down to the central district of the city. After passing through the central part of Kuji, the highway terminates at a junction with National Route 45.

History
On 20 January 1954, a section of the Katsumaki–Numakunai route from the then-town of Kuji to the town of Numakunai was designated as a major local road that would later be included into National Route 281. On 16 August of the same year, the Iwate Prefectural Government certified the Kuji–Numakunai Route as a prefectural route. On 1 April 1970, National Route 281 was created when it was designated as General National Route 281 between the cities of Morioka and Kuji.

The highway served as an evacuation route for the city of Kuji following the 2011 Tōhoku earthquake and subsequent tsunami. Following the disaster, a mountainous section of the highway was rebuilt as a part of the region-wide recovery effort to improve the effectiveness of the highway during future evacuations. The straightening project is set to be completed in 2020.

Major intersections
The route lies entirely within Iwate Prefecture.

See also

References

External links

National highways in Japan
Roads in Iwate Prefecture